Sujathapuram is a railway station on Mysore–Chamarajanagar branch line.
The station is located in Mysore district, Karnataka state, India.

Location

Sujathapuram railway station is located near Nanjangud town in Mysore district.

History 
The project cost . The gauge conversion work of the  stretch was completed.
There are six trains running forward and backward in this route.  Five of them are slow moving passenger trains.

References 

Railway stations in Mysore district